Petropavl Airport (formerly known as Petropavlovsk South)  is an airport in Kazakhstan located  south of Petropavlovsk. It handles medium-sized airliners. Currently, there are flights from Petropavlovsk Airport to Almaty, Nur-Sultan and Shymkent.

Airlines and destinations

The following airlines operate regular scheduled services to and from Petropavlovsk:

See also
List of airports in Kazakhstan
 Kokshetau Airport (located in Akmola Region  from Petropavl)

References

Airports built in the Soviet Union
Airports in Kazakhstan
Buildings and structures in North Kazakhstan Region